St. Ola is a dispersed rural community in the township municipality of Limerick, Hastings County in Central Ontario, Canada. It takes its name from the parish of St. Olaf in Kirkwall, Orkney Islands, and is now largely unoccupied.

At one time there was a Methodist church and a post office.

References

Communities in Hastings County